Parapercis cylindrica, the cylindrical sandperch, is a species of sandperch belonging to the family Pinguipedidae.

Etymology
Genus Parapercis = Greek para, beside, near, compared with + Greek perkis, a fish, perch. Genus Parapercis fishes are closely related to perches, which belong to genus Perca.

Description
Parapercis cylindrica can reach a length of 23 cm. It shows a series of quadrangular dark brown blotches along the body. The largest blotches are joined by dark brown stripes. A narrow dark brown bar is located below middle of eye. Caudal fin is usually yellowish.

Distribution
This species can be found Western Pacific, from Australia to Fiji, southern Japan, northern Sulawesi and Marshall Islands.

Habitat
Perapercis cylindrica is a species associated to shallow reef. It usually can be found in lagoon and seaward reefs on sand and seagrass, at depths between 1 and 20 m.

References

 Wetwebmedia
 Reeflex.net

External links
 

Pinguipedidae
Taxa named by Marcus Elieser Bloch
Fish described in 1792